The 2011 African Fencing Championships were held in Cairo, Egypt from 21 to 25 July.

Medal summary

Men's events

Women's events
Two nations only, Egypt and Algeria, entered a team in women's foil.

Medal table
 Host

References

2014
African Fencing Championships
International fencing competitions hosted by Egypt
2014 in Egyptian sport